Henry Bowman Brady (23 February 1835 Gateshead, England – 10 January 1891 Bournemouth) was a British micropalaeontologist.

Life
He was the second son of Henry Brady, Surgeon of Gateshead, and his wife Hannah Bowman of Derbyshire.

Henry and his older brother George Stewardson Brady were both educated at the Friends' School, Ackworth and at Bootham school, York, where they were schoolfellows of the botanist John Gilbert Baker, and the Rowntree brothers Joseph, John, and Henry, of the famous cocoa business which bore their name.

Brady became a fellow of the Linnean Society on 17 March 1859, but resigned in 1887 ; he was also a fellow of the Geological Society from 1864, of the Royal Society from 1874, serving on its council in 1888, and of the Zoological Society from 1888.

Works

Henry Brady published much on foraminiferans, and several species were named after him Valvulinerea bradyana (Fornasini, 1900), Trifarina bradyi Cushman, 1923, Rosalina bradyi Cushman, 1915, Robertinoides bradyi (Cushman & Parker, 1936), Neoeponides bradyi (Le Calvez, 1974), Fursenkoina bradyi (Cushman, 1922), Evolvocassidulina bradyi Norman, 1881, Ehrenbergina bradyi Cushman, 1922, Cassidulinoides bradyi (Norman, 1881), Parrina bradyi (Millett, 1898), Labrospira bradyi (Robertson, 1891), Karreriella bradyi (Cushman, 1911), Hemisphaerammina bradyi (Loeblich & Tappan, 1957), Dorothia bradyana (Cushman, 1936).

References

Sources

1835 births
1891 deaths
British palaeontologists
People from Gateshead
Micropaleontologists